This is a list of Cascade volcanoes, i.e. volcanoes formed as a result of subduction along the Cascadia subduction zone in the Pacific Northwest of North America. The volcanoes are listed from north to south, by province or state: British Columbia, Washington, Oregon, and California.

British Columbia

Washington

Oregon

California

See also
List of volcanoes in the United States
List of volcanoes in Canada
Volcanology of Canada
Volcanology of Western Canada
List of Northern Cordilleran volcanoes
Lists of volcanoes

Notes

References

Cascades
Volcanoes
Geography of the Pacific Northwest
Cascade Volcanoes
Cascade Volcanoes
Cascade Volcanoes
Cascade Volcanoes
Cascade Volcanoes
Cascade Volcanoes